Marazion is a civil parish and town, on the shore of Mount's Bay in Cornwall, UK. At low water a causeway links it to the town and at high water passenger boats carry visitors between Marazion and St Michael's Mount. 
Marazion is a tourist resort with an active community of artists who produce and sell paintings and pottery in the town's art galleries.

Marazion lies within the Cornwall Area of Outstanding Natural Beauty (AONB). Almost a third of Cornwall has AONB designation, with the same status and protection as a National Park. On the western side of the town is Marazion Marsh, a RSPB reserve and a Site of Special Scientific Interest (SSSI).

History of Marazion
Remains of an ancient bronze furnace, discovered near the town, tend to prove that tin smelting was practised here at an early period.  Marazion was not recorded in the Domesday Book of 1088. Its only charter was granted by Queen Elizabeth I.

Medieval history
The charter attributed to Robert, Count of Mortain granted lands and liberties to St Michael's Mount opposite Marazion and included a market on Thursdays. This appears to have been held from the first on the mainland. From it is probably derived the Marghasbighan (Parvum Forum, lit. "small marketplace") of the earlier and the Marghasyewe (Cornish: "Thursday Market") or Marketjew (Forum Jovis) of the later charters. It may be added that a Jewish origin has been erroneously ascribed to the place from the name Marketjew.

It is certain that Richard, Earl of Cornwall provided that the three fairs, on the two feasts of St Michael and at Mid-Lent, and the three markets which had hitherto been held by the priors of St Michael's Mount on land not their own at Marghasbighan, should in future be held on their own land at Marchadyou. He transferred in fact the fairs and markets from the demesne lands of the Bloyous in Marazion to those of the prior. Its earliest known charter was granted in 1257.

To remedy the loss incurred by this measure Ralph Bloyou in 1331 procured for himself and his heirs a market on Mondays and a fair on the vigil, feast and morrow of St Andrew at Marghasyon. In Leland's time the market was held at Marhasdeythyow (Forum Jovis), and both Norden (1582) and Carew (1602) tell us that Marcajewe signifies the Thursday's market, which, whether etymologically sound or not, shows that the prior's market had prevailed over its rival. In 1595 Queen Elizabeth granted to Marazion a charter of incorporation. This ratified the grant of St Andrew's fair, provided for another on the Feast of St Barnabas and established a market on Saturdays.

The corporation was to consist of a mayor, eight aldermen and twelve capital burgesses. This corporation continued to administer the affairs of the borough until it was dissolved under the Municipal Corporations Act 1883. The chairman of the commissioners retains possession of the regalia. Of the fairs, only the Michaelmas fair has survived and all the markets have gone. The seal of the borough of Marazion was On a shield the arms three castles triple turreted, with the legend "Semper Eadem".

It is stated that Marazion formerly had the right of returning two members to parliament. Dr Borlase gives the name of two, who in 1658, were re-elected: Richard Mlyll, Esq and Thomas Westlake, Esq; but the inhabitants petitioned against them taking their seats because they were unable to pay expenses for their attendance.

Modern history
Under the Commonwealth an attempt was made to secure or recover the right, and two members are said to have been returned, but they were not allowed to take their seats. Marazion was once a flourishing town, owing its prosperity to the throng of pilgrims who came to visit St Michael's Mount (this ceased at the time of the Reformation). During the first half of the 16th century it was twice plundered; first by the French, and later by Cornish rebels. The rise and progress of the neighbouring borough of Penzance in the 17th century marginalised Marazion.

Penwith is believed to be the last part of Cornwall to speak Cornish as a community language. Dolly Pentreath, the last recorded speaker came from Paul in Penwith. A year following the death of Dolly Pentreath, Barrington received a letter, written in Cornish and accompanied by an English translation, from a fisherman in Mousehole named William Bodinar stating that he knew of five people who could speak Cornish in that village alone. Barrington also speaks of a John Nancarrow from Marazion who was a native speaker and survived into the 1790s.

The graveyard of Gulval church is home to the remains of local pirate and smuggler John 'Eyebrows' Thomas of Marazion.

The West Cornwall Railway opened Marazion railway station on 11 March 1852 and its goods yard handled a large volume of perishable traffic – fish, fruit and vegetables – from the surrounding farms and harbours. Marazion station closed to passenger traffic in October 1964 and to freight in December 1965. For many years the site of the closed station was home to Pullman railway carriages which were used as camping coaches. The site, though not conveniently located, is on Cornwall's still-operating passenger main-line, so there are aspirations to re-open it.

The Royal National Lifeboat Institution opened a 'Marazion Lifeboat Station' in 1990, although the  inshore lifeboat was actually kept in a shed on the quayside on St Michael's Mount. The station was closed on 31 October 2001 as it was proving difficult to find enough volunteer crew members. The boat was transferred to the neighbouring Penlee Lifeboat Station at Newlyn on the other side of Mounts Bay where there is a larger population to draw the crews from.

At the end of the Second World War a number of naval vessels, the most famous of which was the battleship  were broken up on the beaches at Marazion. HMS Warspite was beached and broken up in 1947.

The local community radio station is Coast FM (formerly Penwith Radio), which broadcasts on 96.5 and 97.2 FM.

Local government
The A394 road between Marazion, Helston and Penryn was once run by Helston Turnpike Roads Trust, which charged tolls for using the road. On 1 November 1880 the Trust put up for auction the toll houses at Marazion and Wendron as well as ″materials″ such as granite posts, chains, gates, etc. The charging of tolls ended on 7 November 1880 and the road came under the management of the County (note:Cornwall County Council was not formed until 1889).

From 1894 to 1974 Marazion was part of West Penwith Rural District and in a reorganisation of local government in 1974 became part of Penwith District Council. Following the 1974 reorganisation Marazion parish regained its town status and right to elect a Mayor from the Marazion Town Council. As an historical oddity the civic regalia of the Mayor is still held by the Marazion Town Trust: for a Mayoral election in Marazion it is still a requirement for the Mayor-Elect to be appointed the Chairman of the Trust before the actual appointment can take place (this is reflected in the process of the Mayor choosing ceremony where two nominations take place for two separate offices). Cornwall Council is now the principal local authority in the area (since April 2009). The coat of arms of the town of Marazion appears on the seal as three castles triple turreted and the motto is "Semper eadem" (Always the same).

The population in 2011 was 1,440 and the electoral ward population which includes surrounding villages was 4,625

Architecture

The lack of notable or historic buildings led Nikolaus Pevsner to omit the town entirely from the first edition of his Buildings of England account of Cornwall. In the second edition Marazion is described as "attractive as a whole" and he says of the area near the ferry port: the "cobbled pavements and old houses .. give a look of Lyme Regis to the old centre of the town". Nevertheless, several notable architectural buildings lie in the eastern part of Marazion including Chymorvah House and the Mount Haven Hotel next to it, once one of the most haunted hotels in Cornwall, with views of the mount from its terrace. Also of note are Marazion Town Hall and the Marazion War Memorial.

The Old Manor House on Fore Street is a Grade II listed building. The Listing states that it was built circa 1775 for William Cornish a former mayor; extensions were added in the mid 19th century at the rear and the east side of the building. During an unstated number of years in the 1800s, this was the home of noted architect James Piers St Aubyn. The property was listed for sale in 2019. The listing report stated that the house included "original slate floors, open fireplaces, sash windows, exposed beams, intricate cornices and wood panelling" and featured views of St Michael's Mount.

Churches
The original parish church is at St Hilary. In Marazion there was a chapel of ease dedicated to St Hermes (recorded in 1308): by 1735 it had become ruinous and was rebuilt. In 1861 a new church (dedicated to All Saints) was built on the same site which became a parish church in 1893. The architect was J. P. St Aubyn. The Methodist church is a classical revival building of 1862 with galleries and Pevsner mentions one grand Georgian house at the west end of the town.

Sport
Marazion Blues are an association football team, founded in 1906, and disbanded in 2017 because of a lack of players. They were members of the Cornwall Combination League from 1961 to 2004, twice champions in 1978 and 1980 and cup winners in 1972 and 1979. The Blues restarted in July 2018 and will play in the Trelawny League.

See also

 :Category:People from Marazion

References

External links

 
 Marazion town website 
 Cornwall Record Office Online Catalogue for Marazion

 
Towns in Cornwall
Civil parishes in Cornwall
Beaches of Penwith
Seaside resorts in Cornwall